Calvin Bannister (born February 17, 1984) is a former American football defensive back. He was signed by the Baltimore Ravens as an undrafted free agent in 2007, but opted not to go to the Ravens training camp and signed with the Calgary Stampeders of the Canadian Football League on June 10, where he became a starter. He also played for the BC Lions. He played college football at Hampton.

Early life
Bannister went to William Fleming High School where he was a star in track, basketball, and football. He was named an All-Conference performer winning the 100-meter dash, 200-meter dash and 400-meter dash at the 2002 regional meet in track. He also earned state champion honors in the 400-meter dash. He was also named Defensive Player of the Year in football.

References

External links
BC Lions bio
Calgary Stampeders bio
Hampton Pirates bio

American football defensive backs
American players of Canadian football
Canadian football defensive backs
Hampton Pirates football players
Calgary Stampeders players
BC Lions players
African-American players of Canadian football
1984 births
Living people
Sportspeople from Roanoke, Virginia
Players of American football from Virginia
21st-century African-American sportspeople
20th-century African-American people